Village of the Landing (also known as The Landing) was a short-lived incorporated village in the Town of Smithtown in Suffolk County, New York, United States. The population was 144 as of the 1930 United States census.

History 
The Village of the Landing incorporated in 1927 by a 12–7 vote. The village was incorporated because locals wanted local zoning control and were against having a public water supply service the area.

Despite the efforts locals made in incorporating their village, a lack of public interest in the village by locals proved to be detrimental to the new village; locals did not usually attend village meetings. This lack of interest is contributed to the Village of the Landing being dissolved in 1939, after 17 out of 38 voters voted in favor of dissolving the village.

The area which formerly was within the borders of the Village of the Landing is now part of the unincorporated hamlet of Smithtown.

It is known that the Village of the Landing allowed duplex properties to be erected as per its zoning laws.

Demographics 
When the village first incorporated, the total population was 161.

As of the 1930 census, 144 people resided in the Village of the Landing.

At the time the village was disincorporated, the population was 140.

A large number of the people represented by those figures were relatives of families or were their servants.

Government 
The Village of the Branch had 2 Mayors:

 George Strong (1927 – 1936)
 William Leonori Jr. (1936 – 1939)

Infrastructure 
Upon disincorporation, the oversight and maintenance of the former village's roads were given to the Town of Smithtown.

See also 

 East Garden City – Another dissolved community on Long Island.
Pine Valley – Another former village in Suffolk County.

References 

Smithtown, New York